Siemowit V of Rawa (pl: Siemowit V rawski; 1389 - 17 February 1442), was a Polish prince member of the House of Piast from the Masovian branch. He was a Duke of Rawa Mazowiecka, Płock, Sochaczew, Gostynin, Płońsk, Wizna and Belz during 1426-1434 jointly with his brothers, and after the division of the paternal inheritance between him and his brothers in 1434, sole ruler over Rawa Mazowiecka, Gostynin and Sochaczew.

He was the eldest son of Siemowit IV, Duke of Masovia and Alexandra of Lithuania, daughter of Algirdas.

Life
He spent his early years at the court of King Władysław II Jagiełło in Kraków. In 1410 he took part alongside the Polish King in the Battle of Grunwald. In 1416 he assisted with the King at the Council of Constance and also took part of the Polish entourage during the meeting of the King with Sigismund of Luxembourg at Kežmarok.

After 1420 Siemowit IV, due to his progressive blindness, gradually gave participation in the government to his oldest sons, Siemowit V and Casimir II, who were formally named co-rulers. The first major challenge for Siemowit V was the trip to Brest-Litovsk, where on 14 November 1425 he and his brother solemnly vowed to the crown his fidelity and acceptance in the recent controversy who followed after the appointment of Stanisław z Pawłowic (former Chancellor of Siemowit IV) as Bishop of Płock.

Siemowit IV died on 21 January 1426 leaving his domains to his four sons: Siemowit V, Casimir II, Trojden II (d. 1427) and Władysław I (a fifth son, Alexander, followed a Church career). Not wanting to further weakened their positions and domains with subsequents divisions, they decided to co-rule all their paternal inheritance. In accordance with their duties as Polish vassals, soon after they assumed the power went to Sandomierz, where on 8 September 1426 paid homage to King Władysław II (except Casimir II, who avoided the homage until 1430).

Despite the recognition of the authority of the Polish crown over the Masovian Dukes, their relations remained tense. The reason for this was the conflict which broke out between the princes and Stanisław z Pawłowic (Bishop of Płock and faithful supporter of King Władysław II). Siemowit V and his brothers accused the Bishop, among other things, of being despotic in his rule and intrigue against to place them in a difficult position with the Polish King.  According to the Masovian Dukes, the Bishop had falsified documents, which showed a supposed conspiracy to murder the King. The charges are so serious that even the Teutonic Order, the Pope and King Sigismund intervened. At the end, Siemowit V and his brothers lost the case, and the court acquitted the Bishop of all the accusations.

In 1429 Siemowit V attended at the Congress of Lutsk, where King Sigismund proposed the elevation of Vytautas as King of Lithuania.

In the war which broke out in 1431 between Poland and Švitrigaila, the Dukes of Masovia chose the Polish side, and Siemowit V took the whole command over the Polish troops. The campaign was a great success and ended with the signing of a truce on 2 September 1431. As a reward for his help, Siemowit V received from the Polish King the district of Zhydachiv near Volhynia.

The good relationship with the Polish Kingdom was broken unexpectedly in 1432, when Siemowit V began talks with the Teutonic Order in Działdowo and with Švitrigaila in Vilnius for a joint alliance against Poland. Only the removal of Švitrigaila from power in Lithuania prompted and end to the negotiations. There is speculation that the contacts between Siemowit V and Švitrigaila were made with the knowledge and consent of King Władysław II, evidenced by the fact that after all these events the Masovian ruler maintained his proper relations with the Polish crown.

During this time, Siemowit V's bad relations with Teutonic Order caused his frequent contacts with the Duchy of Pomerania and his participation in the expedition of the Hussites in 1433 at Pomerelia.

After the death of Władysław II Jagiełło in 1434, Siemowit V placed his candidacy for the Polish crown. He counted with the support of Spytek of Melsztyn, and was directed against the political influence of the Bishop of Kraków, Zbigniew Oleśnicki. After a meeting in Opatów on 13 July 1434, where the Bishop vigorously defended the rights of the late King's children, the candidacy of Siemowit V was abandoned.

In view of the failure of his plans to obtain the crown, Siemowit V quickly accepted the new ruler Władysław III and on July 25, with his brother Casimir II, attended the coronation of the young monarch. During the ceremony erupted some conflicts with the Bishop Oleśnicki, because he took the place of honor beside the King.

On 31 August 1434 the sons of Siemowit IV finally decided to end their co-rulership and made the formal territorial division. Siemowit V obtained Rawa Mazowiecka, Gostynin and Sochaczew.

After the division of the Duchy, the political activity of Siemowit V was reduced significantly. On 31 December 1435 signed the Peace of Brześć Kujawski. In April 1438 he participated in the Confederation of Nowy Korczyn, where the nobility discouraged King Władysław III to reject the Bohemian crown for his brother Prince Casimir.

Siemowit V died on 17 February 1442 and was buried in the parish Church of St. Peter and Paul, Rawa Mazowiecka.

Marriage and Issue
Between 15 October 1434 and 17 February 1437, Siemowit V married Margareta (1410 - 5 July 1459), a daughter of John II, Duke of Opava-Racibórz and widow of Casimir I of Oświęcim. They had one daughter:

Margareta (1436/40 - bet. 5 May 1483/1 September 1485), married bet. 1447/53 to Konrad IX the Black, Duke of Oleśnica.

After his death without male offspring, mostly of his domains where inherited by his brother Władysław I, except Gostynin, who was given to his widow as dower.

Notes

References
 Supruniuk Anna, Setting the Duke of Mazovia Siemowit IV (1374-1426). Study of the political elite of Mazovia the late fourteenth and fifteenth century, Warsaw 1998
 Supruniuk Anna, Siemowit V, in: Polish Biographical Dictionary, T.37.
 Samsonowicz Henry, Supruniuk Anna,The political history (half of the XIV - the beginning of the sixteenth century), Mazovia Siemowitów, in: History of Mazovia, v. 1 Pultusk 2006.

Dukes of Masovia
1389 births
1442 deaths
People in the Battle of Grunwald